John William Leonard Lyttelton, 11th Viscount Cobham (15 June 1943 – 13 July 2006) was a British nobleman and peer from the Lyttelton family. He was known as "Johnny Lyttelton" to his friends and family.

He was educated at Eton, where his father had been before him, and at Christ's College, Christchurch while his father was Governor-General of New Zealand. He later attended the Royal Agricultural College in Cirencester.

He married Penelope Ann Cooper in 1974, and inherited the family's titles and 200-year-old Worcestershire mansion, Hagley Hall, on his father's death in 1977. Facing inheritance taxes and high maintenance costs  as well as the unstable state of finances left by his predecessors, he auctioned his family's 700-year archive for £164,000, and sold Necker Island to Richard Branson for $120,000. The hall was converted into a conference venue, although it also remained the family home. 
 
He was a member of the Conservative Party, but shyness prevented him from taking the seat in the House of Lords that his hereditary peerage entitled him to. He left the Conservatives in 1992, in protest at Michael Heseltine's announcement that many coal mines would be closed. His first wife was a special adviser to David Mellor when Mellor was Secretary of State for Culture, Media and Sport in 1992. Lady Cobham was later to leave her husband for Mellor, and they were divorced on 30 August 1995. Lord Cobham had to sell family heirlooms to pay his former wife a £1 million divorce settlement. He later confessed to having contemplated suicide over the break-up of his marriage, and admitted sitting in his drawing room holding a loaded shotgun.

Lord Cobham remarried on 1 August 1997 to Lisa Clayton, the first British woman to have sailed single-handed and non-stop around the world.

He opposed the introduction of the ban on fox hunting, and said he would rather go to prison than prevent hunting from taking place on his estate.

Lord Cobham died in Spain. His ashes were returned to Hagley for burial in the Lyttelton plot at Hagley parish church. He had no children from either marriage, and his titles were inherited by his younger brother, Christopher.

References
Obituary, The Guardian, 22 July 2006

External links

Cobham, John Lyttelton, 11th Viscount
Cobham, John Lyttelton, 11th Viscount
Place of birth missing
Cobham, John Lyttleton, 11th Viscount
John
People educated at Christ's College, Christchurch
Cobham, John Lyttleton, 11th Viscount
11

Cobham